Simone Héliard was a French stage and film actress.

Selected filmography
 Mistigri (1931)
 Topaze (1933)
 Côte d'Azur (1932)
 The Champion Cook (1932)
 A Love Story (1933)
 Bach the Millionaire (1933)
 A Day Will Come (1934)
 The Blue Danube (1940)

References

Bibliography
 White, Susan M. The Cinema of Max Ophuls: Magisterial Vision and the Figure of Woman. Columbia University Press, 1995.

External links

1910 births
Year of death unknown
French stage actresses
French film actresses